The 51st Infantry Division was a division of the Philippine Army under the United States Army Forces in the Far East (USAFFE).

Organization

History
The 51st Division was active from 1941 to April 9, 1942, whereupon it surrendered when Bataan fell.  Previously it was active in the City of Manila, Southern Luzon.  BGen. Albert M. Jones (USA) was the division's commander; the Chief of Staff was Col. Edwin E. Aldridge, Inf.; and Col. Adlai C. Young, Inf., was another notable division officer.

Combat Narrative
After the Japanese invasion of the Philippines in December 1941, it formed part of the South Luzon Force (activated December 13, 1941) under Brig. Gen. George M. Parker Jr. The South Luzon Force controlled a zone east and south of Manila. Parker had the PA 41st and 51st Infantry Divisions and the 2nd Provisional Artillery Group of two batteries of the U.S. 86th Field Artillery Regiment (Philippine Scouts).

When the Japanese began landing at Lamon Bay on December 24, 1941, South Luzon Force was badly dispersed.  The 41st Division (PA) on the west coast was in position, but elements of the 51st Division along the east coast were in the process of movement.

Order of battle
 51st Infantry Regiment (PA)
 52nd Infantry Regiment (PA) 
 53rd Infantry Regiment (PA) (Col. John R. Boatwright, Inf.) 
 51st Field Artillery Regiment (PA)  
 51st FA Regt HQ Company  
 1st Bn/51st FA Regt (PA) (75mm guns, 16x) 
 2nd Bn/51st FA Regt (PA) (2.95-inch pack howitzers, 4x)  
 3rd Bn/51st FA Regt (PA)  
 51st Engineer Battalion (PA)
 51st Division Units  
 51st Division Headquarters & HQ Company  
 51st Medical Battalion  
 51st Signal Company  
 51st Quartermaster Company (Motorized)  
 51st QM Transport Company (Truck)

Sources

Bibliography
Morton, Louis. The Fall of the Philippines (Publication 5-2) . Retrieved on 14 Feb 2017.

References

Infantry divisions of the Philippines
Military units and formations of the Philippine Army in World War II
Military units and formations established in 1941
Military units and formations disestablished in 1942